David Randitsheni (1964/65 – 2009) was a South African rapist and serial killer who in 2009 was convicted on 10 counts of murder, 17 counts of rape, 18 counts of kidnapping and one count of indecent assault. He was sentenced to 16 life sentences and 220 years in prison with the judge stipulating that he could not be considered for parole before serving at least 35 years in prison by which time he would be 80-years-old. Only one of his victims was an adult (a woman), the rest were all children.

The crimes were committed over a four-year period from 2004 to 2008 around the town of Modimolle in the Limpopo province.

Randitsheni was found hanging in his prison cell from an apparent suicide shortly after commencing his sentence.

See also
List of serial killers by country
List of serial killers by number of victims

References

1960s births
2009 suicides
Male serial killers
People convicted of indecent assault
People convicted of murder by South Africa
Serial killers who committed suicide in prison custody
South African people convicted of murder
South African serial killers
South African people convicted of rape
Child sexual abuse in South Africa
Suicides by hanging in South Africa
Year of birth uncertain